Felipe I is the name of two Iberian kings:

Philip I of Castile (1478–1506), known as the Handsome or the Fair, son of Maximilian I, Holy Roman Emperor 
Philip I of Portugal (II of Spain)

See also
Philip I (disambiguation)

fr:Philippe Ier
nl:Filips I
ru:Филипп I